The England national basketball team is organised by Basketball England, the sport's governing body in England. England's direct membership of FIBA ended in September 2016, when its national teams were merged into Great Britain teams, so England no longer play in FIBA competitions. England competed in the 2018 Commonwealth Games, finishing in fifth place.

England's biggest success were its four qualifications to EuroBasket, the European championship in basketball. The team won the bronze medal at the 2006 Commonwealth Games.

History

Eurobasket 1946
England's first European championship appearance was at Eurobasket 1946. They lost all four of the games that they played, and subsequently finished last in the field of ten teams.

Eurobasket 1955

A few years later, England qualified for the Eurobasket 1955 in Budapest, where the English Team had a couple of strong showings. After losing their preliminary round games they beat Switzerland, a major player at the global stage until the mid-50s. The victory marked England's first victory at a major international basketball event. Later, England outscored Austria as well. Eventually, the team placed second in the five teams of the classification group, moving to the 9–12 classification semifinals.  There, however, England could not take advantage of the gained self-confidence and lost the next two games. Overall, England finished in 12th place out of the 18 teams, a considerable improvement from its last eurobasket appearance in 1946.

Eurobasket 1961 and 1981
Despite the improvements in the preceding years, Team England did not do well at the Eurobasket 1961 or the Eurobasket 1981 and lost most games. Its lone victory, however, came in 1981 when they beat the elite team of Greece. This victory still stands as one of the major surprises in the history of the tournament.

Commonwealth Games

Melbourne 2006

The men's and women's teams were competing for the first time as England in a major multi-sport event, and it was the first Commonwealth Games in which basketball was featured.

The men's team included Steve Bucknall, the second Englishman to play in the NBA. John Amaechi, who played 284 games in the NBA, came out of retirement to participate in Melbourne. Having lost to Australia in the semi-finals, they faced Nigeria in the Bronze medal match. The teams were tied at 15 points to end the first quarter. Robert Reed and Andrew Bridge led the way as England found their stride in the second phase, and they pulled away in the second half of play. Reed played like a snake possessed and was the top scorer for England with 16 points and dominating the Nigerians who had no answer to his all action style. Michael Martin also contributed with 13 points. England won the game 80–57 to claim the first Bronze medal in Commonwealth Games basketball

Team 
 Antony Burns
 Jermaine Forbes
 Andrew Bridge
 Ronnie Baker
 Delme Herriman
 Andrew Sullivan
 Fabulous Flournoy
 Mike Martin
 Robert Reed
 John Amaechi
 Julius Joseph
 Richard Windle

Coaching Staff 
Coach – Peter Scantlebury
Assistant coach – Michael Hayles
Assistant coach – Tim Lewis

Competition charts

Olympic Games

A red box around the year indicates tournaments played within England

 Played alongside Scotland and Wales as Team Great Britain.

FIBA World Cup

 Played alongside Scotland and Wales as Team Great Britain.

Eurobasket

 Played alongside Scotland and Wales as Team Great Britain.

Commonwealth Games

Current squad

At the FIBA EuroBasket 2003 qualification: (last official squad before formation of Team Great Britain)

Past squad
1946 EuroBasket: finished 10th among 10 teams

Colin Hunt, Douglas Legg, John Hart, Ronald Legg, Frank Cole, Arthur Lee, Derius Hewitt, Stanley Weston, Ken Dight, Charles Watson (Coach: W.Browning)

1948 Olympic Games: finished 20th among 23 teams

Colin Hunt, Douglas Legg, Ronald Legg, Frank Cole, Robert Norris, Stanley Weston, Lionel Price, Trevor Davies, Malcolm Finlay, Stanley McMeekan, Sydney McMeekan, Alexander Eke, Harry Weston

1955 EuroBasket: finished 12th among 18 teams

Arthur Cladingboel, Reg Fearn, William James, Gordon Cook, Dennis Wilkinson, Colin Wedge, Alan Bruce, Ugo Agnelli, Wilf Byrne, Keith Ledbrook, Michael Roblou, Ronald Rix, N.Smith

1961 EuroBasket: finished 19th among 19 teams

Raymond Kirk, Kornel Tober, Alan Wardle, Peter Creasey, Wilfred Byrne, Alan Tillot, Alan Hildyard, Ronald Hextall, Geoffrey Kaiser, Dennis Wakefield, George Whitmore, Terry Keogh (Coach: Thomas Vaughan)

1981 EuroBasket: finished 12th among 12 teams

David Lloyd, Neville Hopkins, David Berry, Martin Clark, Paul Richards, Nick Burns, Clive Hartley, Jim McCauley, Ian Day, Paul Stimpson, Dan Lloyd, Karl Tatham (Coach: Victor Ambler)

See also
England women's national basketball team
Basketball at the 2006 Commonwealth Games
England at the 2006 Commonwealth Games (Basketball)
England national under-19 basketball team

References

External links
Basketball In England
 FIBA profile
 Archived records of England team participations

 
 
Men's national basketball teams
1937 establishments in England

he:נבחרת סקוטלנד בכדורסל